The 1995 Individual Ice Speedway World Championship was the 30th edition of the World Championship  The Championship was held as a Grand Prix series over ten rounds.

Classification

See also 
 1995 Speedway Grand Prix in classic speedway
 1995 Team Ice Racing World Championship

References 

Ice speedway competitions
World